Traugott Glöckler (born 12 January 1944) is a German athlete. He competed in the men's shot put at the 1968 Summer Olympics.

References

1944 births
Living people
Athletes (track and field) at the 1968 Summer Olympics
Athletes (track and field) at the 1972 Summer Olympics
German male shot putters
Olympic athletes of East Germany
Place of birth missing (living people)
Universiade silver medalists for West Germany
Universiade medalists in athletics (track and field)
Medalists at the 1967 Summer Universiade